Sanjeev Kumar Yadav is an officer of DANIPS cadre. He currently serves as Deputy Commissioner of Police (DCP), Special Cell, in Delhi Police. He received the President's Police Medal eleven times for Gallantry.

Early life and education
Sanjeev Kumar Yadav was born on 9 July 1971. He has done his graduation from Allahabad University in 1991 and masters from Guru Nanak Dev University in 1999.

Batla House case
He was a part of the Batla House encounter case with Delhi Police. He played a major role in this case.

In Popular culture
In 2019 a Bollywood film named Batla House, directed by Nikhil Advani was made, being based on this encounter. In the movie, his character was named ACP Sanjay Kumar and was portrayed by actor John Abraham.

Personal life
Yadav is married to Shobhna Yadav a news anchor, with whom he has a son and a daughter.

See also
Batla House encounter case
Batla House

References

External links
Kumar Yadav DANIPS, has been inducted in IPS by the UPSC.
Sanjeev Yadav: गणतंत्र दिवस के मौके पर 11वीं बार मिलेगा वीरता के लिए राष्ट्रपति से पुरस्कार, जानें कौन हैं IPS संजीव यादव
forced to stay top anti-terror cop's transfer
wins 11th President’s Medal for Gallantry

Indian Police Service officers
Commissioners of Delhi Police
1971 births
Living people

bn:সঞ্জীব কুমার যাদব
hi:संजीव कुमार यादव
kn:ಸಂಜೀವ್ ಕುಮಾರ್ ಯಾದವ್
pa:ਸੰਜੀਵ ਕੁਮਾਰ ਯਾਦਵ